Southerton is a surname. Notable people with the surname include:

 Don Southerton, American business consultant and author
 James Southerton (1827–1880), English cricketer
 Simon Southerton, Australian plant geneticist and former Mormon

See also
 Southerton, an industrial area in Harare, Zimbabwe
 Sotherton, a place in England